Bauyrzhan Nurlanuly Baytana (Bauyrjan Nūrlanūly Baitana; born 6 June 1992) is a Kazakhstani footballer who plays as a midfielder for FC Taraz.

Career
On 10 August 2020, Baytana returned to FC Taraz.

Career statistics

International

References

External links

Bauyrzhan Baytana at Vesti.kz 

Living people
1992 births
Association football midfielders
Kazakhstani footballers
Kazakhstan youth international footballers
Kazakhstan under-21 international footballers
Kazakhstan international footballers
Kazakhstan Premier League players
FC Taraz players
FC Kairat players
FC Aktobe players
FC Atyrau players
FC Sunkar players
FC Tobol players
FC Shakhter Karagandy players
People from Taraz